Andrew Clayton Vaughn (born April 3, 1998) is an American professional baseball first baseman and outfielder for the Chicago White Sox of Major League Baseball (MLB). He made his MLB debut in 2021. Vaughn played college baseball at California, and won the Golden Spikes Award in 2018.

Amateur career
Vaughn attended Maria Carrillo High School in Santa Rosa, California. Playing for the baseball team, he batted .380 with 29 doubles, three triples, one home run, 76 runs batted in (RBIs), 49 walks, and 15 strikeouts in 332 at bats. As a pitcher, he had 17–6 win–loss record with a 2.05 earned run average and 166 strikeouts.

Vaughn enrolled at the University of California, Berkeley to play college baseball for the California Golden Bears. As a freshman, Vaughn played first base and made ten appearances as a pitcher. He hit 12 home runs while batting .349/.414/.555 and won the Pac-12 Conference Freshman of the Year Award. He played collegiate summer baseball in 2017 for the Victoria HarbourCats of the West Coast League.

As a sophomore in 2018, Vaughn hit 23 home runs batting .402/.531/.819. Perfect Game/Rawlings named him their National Player of the Year, and he won the Pac-12 Conference Baseball Player of the Year Award and Golden Spikes Award. After the 2018 season, he played collegiate summer baseball with the Wareham Gatemen of the Cape Cod Baseball League. In 2019, his junior year, he hit .374/.539/.704 with 15 home runs and 50 RBIs in 52 games.

Professional career
Considered a top prospect for the 2019 Major League Baseball (MLB) draft, Vaughn was selected by the Chicago White Sox with the third overall pick. Vaughn was selected in the draft along with six other Cal teammates. Vaughn signed  with the White Sox for $7.2 million. 

The White Sox first assigned Vaughn to the Rookie-level Arizona League White Sox, and promoted him to the Kannapolis Intimidators of the Class A South Atlantic League after hitting .600/.625/.933 with a home run, two doubles, and four RBIs in three Arizona League games. Vaughn was promoted again to the Winston-Salem Dash of the Class A-Advanced Carolina League after batting .253/.388/.410 with two home runs, seven doubles, 11 RBIs, and 14 runs scored in 23 games with Kannapolis. With the Dash he batted .252/.349/.411. After the season, on October 10, he was selected for the United States national baseball team in the 2019 WBSC Premier 12.

The White Sox invited Vaughn to spring training as a non-roster player in 2021. Following an injury to left fielder Eloy Jiménez, the White Sox began to experiment with playing Vaughn in left field. The White Sox added Vaughn to their 40-man roster to include him on their Opening Day roster. Vaughn made his MLB debut on April 2 as the starting left fielder against the Los Angeles Angels. On May 12, Vaughn hit his first major league home run off of J. A. Happ of the Minnesota Twins. Overall in 2021, Vaughn hit .235 in 127 games with 15 home runs and 48 RBIs.

In 2022 he batted .271/.321/.429. On defense, he had the worst outs above average (OAA) rate in major league baseball, at -16.

References

External links

1998 births
Living people
All-American college baseball players
Arizona League White Sox players 
Baseball pitchers
Baseball players from California
California Golden Bears baseball players
Chicago White Sox players
Kannapolis Intimidators players
Major League Baseball first basemen
Major League Baseball outfielders
Sportspeople from Santa Rosa, California
United States national baseball team players
Wareham Gatemen players
Winston-Salem Dash players
2019 WBSC Premier12 players
Victoria HarbourCats players